Anthony Paul Pettis (born January 27, 1987) is an American professional mixed martial artist. Pettis formerly fought in the Welterweight, Lightweight, and Featherweight divisions of the Ultimate Fighting Championship (UFC) and Professional Fighters League (PFL). He is a former UFC Lightweight Champion. Pettis was also the final WEC Lightweight Champion prior to the promotion being merged into the UFC.

Early life
Pettis was born on January 27, 1987, in Milwaukee, Wisconsin, to Annette (née Garcia) and Eugene Pettis Jr. He grew up in the south side of Milwaukee, Wisconsin, along with his older brother, Reynaldo Pettis and younger brother, Sergio Pettis, who fights in the flyweight division.

Pettis is of Mexican ancestry. His grandfather, Eugenio Pérez, anglicized the family name from Pérez to Pettis to avoid discrimination. Pettis attended Dominican High School.

He started training in taekwondo and boxing at the age of 5. In college he also started wrestling. When he went to train mixed martial arts at Roufusport at the age of 18, he already had a 3rd degree black belt in taekwondo. He later trained in capoeira.

On November 12, 2003, Pettis' father was stabbed to death by a robber at a friend's house.

Mixed martial arts career

Early career
Anthony Pettis made his professional MMA debut in January 2007. He compiled a record of 8–0 in all fights being held by Adam Sandoval and Duke Roufus before debuting with the World Extreme Cagefighting (WEC), winning the Gladiator Fighting Series Lightweight Championship. His last fight before joining the WEC was a short notice welterweight bout.

Pettis also has a professional kickboxing background. In MMA, Pettis is known for his smooth and technical fighting style, as well as his athletic feats and wide range of techniques.

Pettis is coached by kickboxer and MMA trainer Duke Roufus and is a member of Roufusport where he trains with fighters Alan Belcher, Erik Koch, Ben Rothwell, Ben Askren, and Danny Downes.

Before joining the WEC, Pettis went to The Ultimate Fighter: United States vs. United Kingdom tryouts but did not make it to the show.

World Extreme Cagefighting

2009
Pettis was expected to make his promotional debut against Anthony Njokuani on April 5, 2009, at WEC 40. However, Pettis pulled out of the fight with a hand injury and was replaced by Bart Palaszewski.

Pettis made his WEC debut at WEC 41 on June 7, 2009, where he defeated Mike Campbell via first-round triangle choke.

He was then expected to fight Rob McCullough at WEC 44 on November 18, 2009, but was pulled off the card with an undisclosed injury.

Pettis suffered his first professional loss on December 19, 2009, at WEC 45, dropping a split decision to Bart Palaszewski.

2010

Pettis rebounded from the loss with a head-kick KO victory over Danny Castillo on March 6, 2010, at WEC 47, earning Knockout of the Night honors. Training for the fight, as well as Pettis's family life, were both documented on an episode of the MTV show World of Jenks.

Pettis suffered almost no damage in the bout with Castillo and made a quick return at WEC 48 on April 24, 2010, against Alex Karalexis, replacing Zack Micklewright on short notice. He won the fight via submission in the second round.

Pettis faced Shane Roller on August 18, 2010, at WEC 50. Pettis surprised many by taking down Roller multiple times and frustrating him with fast-paced scrambles. Pettis displayed diversity in his striking with two Capoeira kicks, the martelo and the aú batido. After several submission attempts, Pettis secured a fight-ending triangle choke in the closing seconds of the fight, earning a Submission of the Night bonus.

His last WEC fight came against Benson Henderson on December 16, 2010, at WEC 53 for the WEC Lightweight Championship. The fight was closely contested throughout, providing back and forth action, both standing and on the ground. In the fifth round Pettis ran up the cage, jumped off the cage, then landed a switch kick while airborne. Sports reporters later named this the Showtime Kick. Pettis won the fight via unanimous decision (48–47, 49–46, 48–47) to become the final WEC Lightweight Champion. The fight was also awarded as Fight of the Night which won Henderson and Pettis an extra $10,000.

Ultimate Fighting Championship

2010
In October 2010, World Extreme Cagefighting merged with the Ultimate Fighting Championship (UFC). As part of the merger, a majority of the WEC fighters were transferred to the UFC.

Pettis was expected to face the winner of Frankie Edgar and Gray Maynard, which took place at UFC 125. However, the bout was declared a draw, and Edgar–Maynard 3 was scheduled for UFC 130, but both fighters sustained injuries before the fight, which was postponed.

2011
Instead of waiting for the winner of Edgar/Maynard 3, Pettis faced Clay Guida on June 4 at The Ultimate Fighter 13 Finale. He lost the fight via unanimous decision.

Pettis next faced Jeremy Stephens on October 8 at UFC 136. Pettis won the closely contested bout via unanimous decision.

2012
Pettis faced Joe Lauzon on February 25 at UFC 144. He won the fight via knockout in round one. His performance earned Knockout of the Night honors.

2013
After spending the majority of 2012 recovering from a litany of injuries, Pettis faced Donald Cerrone on January 26, 2013, at UFC on Fox 6. He won the fight via TKO in round one. The performance also earned Pettis Knockout of the Night honors. After the victory, Dana White said he was "sold" on Pettis and admitted that after Benson Henderson against Gilbert Melendez on UFC on Fox 7, Pettis was to be the next to fight for the lightweight title.

On February 5, it was announced that Pettis would not wait for a title shot at lightweight, and would instead be dropping down to 145 pounds to challenge featherweight champion, José Aldo on August 3 at UFC 163. However, on June 14, Dana White announced that Pettis had pulled out of the Aldo bout with a serious knee injury, and that Aldo would instead defend the title against Chan Sung Jung.

A few weeks later after a quick recovery, it was announced on July 12 that Pettis would replace TJ Grant in a rematch for the UFC Lightweight Championship against Benson Henderson on August 31 at UFC 164. Pettis defeated Henderson via armbar submission in the first round to claim the UFC Lightweight Title. The win also earned Pettis his first Submission of the Night bonus award in the UFC.

Pettis was expected to make his first title defense against T. J. Grant on December 14 at UFC on Fox 9. However, Grant revealed in mid-September that he had yet to be medically cleared after suffering a concussion in training and would not be eligible to compete on December 14. Pettis was then expected to face Josh Thomson at the event. However, the bout was canceled in mid-November after Pettis pulled out of the bout citing a knee injury.

2014
Pettis was selected to serve as a coach on The Ultimate Fighter 20, opposite Gilbert Melendez and the two would face each other at UFC 181 on December 6, 2014. Pettis won the fight via guillotine choke in the second round, becoming the first man to finish Melendez. He also earned a Performance of the Night bonus award.

2015
Pettis faced Rafael dos Anjos on March 14 at UFC 185. He lost the bout and the championship by unanimous decision.

Pettis was expected to face Myles Jury on July 25, 2015, at UFC on Fox 16. However, Pettis pulled out of the bout citing another injury and was replaced by Edson Barboza.

2016
Pettis faced Eddie Alvarez on January 17, 2016, at UFC Fight Night 81. He lost the back-and-forth bout via split decision.

Pettis faced Edson Barboza on April 23, 2016, at UFC 197. Pettis lost the fight via unanimous decision.

On the heels of a three-fight losing streak, Pettis announced in June 2016 his intention to drop to featherweight for his next fight. Pettis fought Charles Oliveira in his featherweight debut on August 27, 2016, at UFC on Fox 21. After another back-and-forth fight which saw Oliveira take his back multiple times, Pettis submitted Oliveira via guillotine choke in the 3rd round.

Pettis faced Max Holloway for the interim UFC Featherweight Championship on December 10, 2016, at UFC 206. At the weigh-ins, Pettis came in at 148 pounds, three pounds over the featherweight limit of 145 lbs. for a championship fight. As a result, in the event that Pettis were to win the fight with Holloway, he would be ineligible for the UFC championship. Pettis was also fined 20% of his purse, which went to Holloway and the bout proceeded at a catchweight. Pettis was the first fighter to miss weight for a UFC championship bout since Travis Lutter at UFC 67 in February 2007. He lost the fight via TKO in the third round.

2017
Pettis faced Jim Miller in a lightweight bout on July 8, 2017, at UFC 213. He won the fight by unanimous decision.

Pettis faced Dustin Poirier on November 11, 2017, at UFC Fight Night 120. Pettis lost the fight via submission due to a rib injury suffered from a body triangle applied by Poirier. This fight also won him the Fight of the Night bonus award.

2018
Pettis was expected to face Michael Chiesa on April 7, 2018, at UFC 223, but the bout was canceled two days before the event after Chiesa was injured in an incident in which Conor McGregor hurled a dolly through the window of the bus Chiesa was in. The shards of the shattered window cut Chiesa, who was deemed unfit to fight by the athletic commission.

On April 6, 2018, UFC Featherweight Champion Max Holloway was declared medically unfit by the New York State Athletic Commission and was pulled from his main event fight against Khabib Nurmagomedov. Pettis accepted the opportunity to fight Khabib Nurmagomedov at UFC 223 for the lightweight championship on a day's notice with the hope of getting $1,000,000 for the fight. The UFC declined to pay him this much money and the deal fell through.

The bout with Chiesa was rescheduled to UFC 226. At weight-ins, Chiesa weighed in at 157.5 pounds, 1.5 pounds over the non-title lightweight limit of 156 pounds. As a result, the fight proceeded catchweight bout with Chiesa forfeiting 30% of his purse to Pettis. Pettis won the fight via triangle armbar submission in the second round. This fight earned him the Performance of the Night award.

Pettis faced Tony Ferguson on October 6, 2018, at UFC 229. After a back-and-forth fight, Pettis knocked down Ferguson in round two, but subsequently broke his hand in the process, going on to lose by corner stoppage due to his injury before the third round. This fight earned him the Fight of the Night award.

2019
On January 19, 2019, it was announced that Pettis would be returning to Welterweight for the first time since 2008 to face Stephen Thompson. This fight served as the headliner of UFC on ESPN+ 6 on March 23, 2019. Thompson outstruck Pettis for most of the bout, however Pettis won the fight via knockout late round two, becoming the first man to knockout Thompson in his MMA and kickboxing careers. This win earned him the Performance of the Night award.

Pettis faced Nate Diaz on August 17, 2019, at UFC 241. He lost the fight via unanimous decision.

2020

Pettis faced Carlos Diego Ferreira in a lightweight bout on January 18, 2020, at UFC 246. He lost the fight via rear-naked choke submission in the second round.

Pettis faced Donald Cerrone in a rematch on May 9, 2020, at UFC 249. He won the fight via unanimous decision.

Pettis faced Alex Morono at UFC Fight Night: Thompson vs. Neal on December 19, 2020. He won the fight via unanimous decision. With this being the last remaining bout on Pettis' UFC contract, Pettis announced on December 22 that he was choosing not to accept a new offer from the UFC and would be testing the free agent market.

Professional Fighters League

2021 Season 
Just one day after announcing he would be testing free agency, Pettis announced on December 23, 2020, that he has signed a multi-fight deal with the Professional Fighters League, and he would be competing as a lightweight in the 2021 season.

Pettis made his PFL debut against Clay Collard on April 23, 2021, at PFL 1. He lost the bout via unanimous decision.

Pettis was scheduled to face Alexander Martinez at PFL 4 on June 10, 2021. However, Pettis withdrew due to illness and Martinez faced Natan Schulte. Schulte's opponent Raush Manfio, faced Pettis at PFL 6 on June 25, 2021. Pettis lost the close bout via split decision.

2022 Season 
Pettis was scheduled to face Myles Price on April 23, 2022, at PFL 1. It was later announced that the bout would be rescheduled for PFL 3. Pettis submitted Price in the first round via triangle choke.

Pettis faced Stevie Ray on June 24, 2022, at PFL 5. He lost the fight via a modified body triangle submission in the second round.

Pettis rematched Stevie Ray in the semifinals of the Lightweight tournament on August 5, 2022, at PFL 7. Once again, Pettis lost the bout, this time via unanimous decision.

Boxing 

On February 6, 2023, it was announced that Pettis would make his professional boxing debut on April 1, 2023, against former four-division boxing champion, Roy Jones Jr. at Gamebred Boxing 4.

Championships and accomplishments
Ultimate Fighting Championship
UFC Lightweight Championship (One time)
One successful title defense
Fight of the Night (Two times) vs. Dustin Poirier and Tony Ferguson
Knockout of the Night (Two times) vs. Joe Lauzon and Donald Cerrone
Submission of the Night (One time) vs. Benson Henderson
Performance of the Night (Three times) vs. Gilbert Melendez, Michael Chiesa, and Stephen Thompson
World Extreme Cagefighting
WEC Lightweight Championship (One time; last)
Knockout of the Night (One time) vs. Danny Castillo
Submission of the Night (One time) vs. Shane Roller
Fight of the Night (One time) vs. Benson Henderson
Gladiators Fighting Series
GFS Lightweight Championship (One time)
One successful title defense
FIGHT! Magazine
2010 Newcomer of the Year
Inside MMA
2013 Male Fighter of the Year Bazzie Award
MMAFighting.com
2010 Fight of the Year vs. Benson Henderson on December 16
Sherdog
2010 Breakthrough Fighter of the Year
2010 All-Violence First Team
2013 All-Violence First Team
USA Today
2010 Fight of the Year vs. Benson Henderson on December 16
MMAJunkie.com
2019 March Knockout of the Month vs. Stephen Thompson
World MMA Awards
2018 Fight of the Year vs. Tony Ferguson at UFC 229

Personal life
Along with business partners Duke Roufus and Scott Joffe, Pettis owns the Roufusport MMA Academy and the Showtime Sports Bar in Milwaukee.

Pettis along with Jon Jones, Urijah Faber, Joseph Benavidez, Mark Muñoz, Chad Mendes, and Scott Jorgensen starred in a Form Athletics (now owned by K-Swiss) commercial.

On December 2, 2013, Pettis received a Certificate of Achievement by the Governor of Wisconsin, Scott Walker.

On June 30, 2014, it was announced that Pettis signed a sponsorship deal with Reebok.

In the fall of 2014, Pettis was voted to be the first UFC champion to appear on the cover of General Mills' Wheaties box wearing his belt. The box appeared in stores in early 2015. However, when the box came out Anthony Pettis had already lost his belt to dos Anjos.

Pettis has two daughters, one from a previous relationship and one with his current partner.

Television
Pettis appeared on episode 4 of World of Jenks, where documentary maker Andrew Jenks lived with Pettis for a week before his fight against Danny Castillo at WEC 47. The episode gave an inside look into Pettis' fight preparations as well as giving insights into his family life.

Mixed martial arts record

|-
|Loss
|align=center|25–14
|Stevie Ray
|Decision (unanimous)
|PFL 7
|
|align=center|3
|align=center|5:00
|New York City, New York, United States
|
|-
|Loss
|align=center|25–13
|Stevie Ray
|Submission (twister)
|PFL 5
|
|align=center|2
|align=center|3:57
|Atlanta, Georgia, United States
|
|-
|Win
|align=center|25–12
|Myles Price
|Submission (triangle choke)
|PFL 3
|
|align=center|1
|align=center|4:17
|Arlington, Texas, United States
|
|-
|Loss
|align=center|24–12
|Raush Manfio
|Decision (split)
|PFL 6 
|
|align=center|3
|align=center|5:00
|Atlantic City, New Jersey, United States
|
|-
|Loss
|align=center|24–11
|Clay Collard
|Decision (unanimous)
|PFL 1 
|
|align=center|3
|align=center|5:00
|Atlantic City, New Jersey, United States
|
|-
|Win
|align=center|24–10
|Alex Morono
|Decision (unanimous)
|UFC Fight Night: Thompson vs. Neal
|
|align=center|3
|align=center|5:00
|Las Vegas, Nevada, United States
| 
|-
|Win
|align=center|23–10
|Donald Cerrone
|Decision (unanimous)
|UFC 249
|
|align=center|3
|align=center|5:00
|Jacksonville, Florida, United States
|
|-
|Loss
|align=center|22–10
|Carlos Diego Ferreira
|Submission (rear-naked choke)
|UFC 246 
|
|align=center|2
|align=center|1:46
|Las Vegas, Nevada, United States
|
|
|-
|Loss
|align=center|22–9
|Nate Diaz
|Decision (unanimous)
|UFC 241 
|
|align=center|3
|align=center|5:00
|Los Angeles, California, United States
|
|-
|Win
|align=center|22–8
|Stephen Thompson
|KO (punches)
|UFC Fight Night: Thompson vs. Pettis
|
|align=center|2
|align=center|4:55
|Nashville, Tennessee, United States
|
|-
|Loss
|align=center|21–8
|Tony Ferguson
|TKO (corner stoppage)
|UFC 229
|
|align=center|2
|align=center|5:00
|Las Vegas, Nevada, United States
|
|-
|Win
|align=center|21–7
|Michael Chiesa
|Submission (triangle armbar)
|UFC 226
|
|align=center|2
|align=center|0:52
|Las Vegas, Nevada, United States
|
|-
|Loss
|align=center| 20–7
|Dustin Poirier
|Submission (body triangle)
|UFC Fight Night: Poirier vs. Pettis
|
|align=center|3
|align=center|2:08
|Norfolk, Virginia, United States
|
|-
|Win
|align=center|20–6
|Jim Miller
|Decision (unanimous)
|UFC 213
|
|align=center|3
|align=center|5:00
|Las Vegas, Nevada, United States
|
|-
|Loss
|align=center|19–6
|Max Holloway
|TKO (body kick and punches)
|UFC 206
|
|align=center|3
|align=center|4:50
|Toronto, Ontario, Canada
|
|-
|Win
|align=center|19–5
|Charles Oliveira
|Submission (guillotine choke)
|UFC on Fox: Maia vs. Condit
|
|align=center|3
|align=center|1:49
|Vancouver, British Columbia, Canada
|
|-
|Loss
|align=center|18–5
|Edson Barboza
|Decision (unanimous)
|UFC 197
|
|align=center|3
|align=center|5:00
|Las Vegas, Nevada, United States
|
|-
|Loss
|align=center|18–4
|Eddie Alvarez
|Decision (split)
|UFC Fight Night: Dillashaw vs. Cruz
|
|align=center|3
|align=center|5:00
|Boston, Massachusetts, United States
|
|-
| Loss
|align=center|18–3
|Rafael dos Anjos
|Decision (unanimous)
|UFC 185
|
|align=center|5
|align=center|5:00
|Dallas, Texas, United States
|
|-
| Win
|align=center| 18–2
|Gilbert Melendez
|Submission (guillotine choke)
|UFC 181
|
|align=center|2
|align=center|1:53
|Las Vegas, Nevada, United States
|
|-
| Win
|align=center| 17–2
| Benson Henderson
|Submission (armbar)
|UFC 164
| 
|align=center|1
|align=center|4:31
|Milwaukee, Wisconsin, United States
|
|-
| Win
|align=center| 16–2
| Donald Cerrone
| KO (kick to the body)
|UFC on Fox: Johnson vs. Dodson
| 
|align=center|1
|align=center|2:35
|Chicago, Illinois, United States
|
|-
| Win
|align=center| 15–2
| Joe Lauzon
| KO (head kick and punches)
| UFC 144
| 
|align=center|1
|align=center|1:21
|Saitama, Japan
| 
|-
| Win
|align=center| 14–2
| Jeremy Stephens
| Decision (split)
| UFC 136
| 
|align=center| 3
|align=center| 5:00
|Houston, Texas, United States
|
|-
| Loss
|align=center| 13–2
| Clay Guida
| Decision (unanimous)
| The Ultimate Fighter: Team Lesnar vs. Team dos Santos Finale
| 
|align=center| 3
|align=center| 5:00
|Las Vegas, Nevada, United States
|
|-
|Win
|align=center| 13–1
|Benson Henderson
|Decision (unanimous)
|WEC 53
|
|align=center| 5
|align=center| 5:00
|Glendale, Arizona, United States
|
|-
| Win
|align=center| 12–1
| Shane Roller
| Submission (triangle choke)
| WEC 50
| 
|align=center| 3
|align=center| 4:51
|Las Vegas, Nevada, United States
| 
|-
| Win
|align=center| 11–1
| Alex Karalexis
| Submission (triangle choke)
| WEC 48
| 
|align=center| 2
|align=center| 1:35
|Sacramento, California, United States
|
|-
| Win
|align=center| 10–1
| Danny Castillo
| KO (head kick and punches)
| WEC 47
| 
|align=center| 1
|align=center| 2:27
|Columbus, Ohio, United States
| 
|-
| Loss
|align=center| 9–1
| Bart Palaszewski
| Decision (split)
| WEC 45
| 
|align=center| 3
|align=center| 5:00
|Las Vegas, Nevada, United States
|
|-
| Win
|align=center| 9–0
| Mike Campbell
| Submission (triangle choke)
| WEC 41
| 
|align=center| 1
|align=center| 1:49
|Sacramento, California, United States
|
|-
| Win
|align=center| 8–0
| Gabe Walbridge
| TKO (punches)
| GFS: Season's Beatings
| 
|align=center| 1
|align=center| 0:56
|Milwaukee, Wisconsin, United States
| 
|-
| Win
|align=center| 7–0
| Jay Ellis
| TKO (submission to punches)
| GFS 55
| 
|align=center| 1
|align=center| 1:12
|Milwaukee, Wisconsin, United States
| 
|-
| Win
|align=center| 6–0
| Sherron Leggett
| Decision (split)
| GFS: Fight Club
| 
|align=center| 3
|align=center| 5:00
|Milwaukee, Wisconsin, United States
| 
|-
| Win
|align=center| 5–0
| Mike Lambrecht
| KO (kick)
| GFS: Knockout Kings
| 
|align=center| 1
|align=center| 1:49
|Milwaukee, Wisconsin, United States
|
|-
| Win
|align=center| 4–0
| George Barrazza
| TKO (punches)
| GFS: The Warriors
| 
|align=center| 1
|align=center| 2:31
|Milwaukee, Wisconsin, United States
|
|-
| Win
|align=center| 3–0
| Michael Skinner
| TKO (submission to punches)
| GFS: Seasons Beatings
| 
|align=center| 1
|align=center| 0:36
|Milwaukee, Wisconsin, United States
|
|-
| Win
|align=center| 2–0
| Lonny Amdahl
| TKO (injury)
| GFS: Rumble in the Cage
| 
|align=center| 1
|align=center| 0:12
|Green Bay, Wisconsin, United States
|
|-
| Win
|align=center| 1–0
| Tom Erspamer
| TKO (punches)
| GFS: Super Brawl
| 
|align=center| 1
|align=center| 0:24
|Wisconsin, United States
|

Boxing record

Pay-per-view bouts

See also

 List of male mixed martial artists

References

External links
 Anthony Pettis at PFL
 
 

Living people
1987 births
Sportspeople from Milwaukee
Mixed martial artists from Wisconsin
American male mixed martial artists
American male taekwondo practitioners
American practitioners of Brazilian jiu-jitsu
People awarded a black belt in Brazilian jiu-jitsu
American capoeira practitioners
American sportspeople of Puerto Rican descent
American mixed martial artists of Mexican descent
Lightweight mixed martial artists
Mixed martial artists utilizing taekwondo
Mixed martial artists utilizing capoeira
Mixed martial artists utilizing boxing
Mixed martial artists utilizing collegiate wrestling
Mixed martial artists utilizing Brazilian jiu-jitsu
Ultimate Fighting Championship male fighters
World Extreme Cagefighting champions
Ultimate Fighting Championship champions